The Cowin Showjet (炫界) is a subcompact crossover SUV produced by the Chinese manufacturer Cowin Auto (subsidiary of Chery). The model shared the platform with the earlier introduced Chery Tiggo 5x and is designed by Pininfarina.

Overview

The Cowin Showjet was revealed on 24 December 2019. The Showjet is positioned below the compact Cowin X3 as Cowin's latest budget crossover. 

Showjet Pro
A variant called the Cowin Showjet Pro was launched in 2021, with the production of the Showjet Pro starting in March 2021. The Cowin Showjet Pro features a redesigned front fascia and a variant of the engine of the regular Showjet, the SQRE4T15 1.5-litre inline-4 turbo engine, producing .

EMC Wave 3

In September 2022, another importer also starts to sell the vehicle in Italy. Eurasia Motors (local importer of Great Wall and Haval) launched a new brand named EMC and renamed the Showjet as EMC Wave 3. It is manufactured in Sichuan, China, and converted to LPG in Piedmont, Northern Italy.

References

External links
Official website

2020s cars
Cars introduced in 2020
Cars of China
Showjet
Crossover sport utility vehicles
Front-wheel-drive vehicles
Mini sport utility vehicles